John Hardy, established in Bali in 1975, creates artisan handcrafted jewelry. Each of John Hardy’s distinctive collections conveys evocative symbolism and honors the transmission of creative energy from the artist to the wearer. Since inception, the company has been deeply rooted in the essential values of community, artisanship, and sustainability.

History 
John Hardy jewelry was founded in 1975 by Canadian designer-and-artist John Hardy. He visited Bali in the mid-1970s and the island's jewelry-making traditions raised his interest. He began learning the techniques of the local artisans then developed his first pieces by applying new design concepts to traditional Balinese techniques.

The John Hardy compound was built in Mumbal, Bali in 1996 and is the company production center where the jewelry is created. It also serves as a living and gathering space with an organic farm and low impact buildings.

In 1999, Guy Bedarida, a senior designer of haute joaillerie of the Place Vendôme, joined the company as Head Designer and expanded Hardy’s design concepts to include the use of classical European jewelry techniques and new motifs inspired by nature and ancient East Asian art styles and themes.

In 2007, then John Hardy president Damien Dernoncourt, with Head Designer and Creative Director, Bedarida, purchased the company from Hardy. That same year the company headquarters was moved to Hong Kong and a satellite office was opened in New York.

The company opened its first flagship store in Plaza Indonesia, Jakarta in 2010. In 2011, it opened its first store at The Landmark, Hong Kong. In 2014, two more stores were opened in Bali, Indonesia.

On July 31, 2014, John Hardy announced that Robert Hanson, former CEO of American Eagle Outfitters, Inc., was appointed CEO.

Hollie Bonneville Barden joined John Hardy as the Creative Director in 2016 and debuted her first collection for the brand in Fall, 2017. After receiving formal training in jewelry design from London’s Central Saint Martin’s College and the Wimbledon School of Art, Hollie held design positions at numerous boutique jewelry brands before working for an internationally renowned high jewelry house within the LVMH portfolio. She possesses both an extensive formal training in fine jewelry and an inventive outlook on design. Today, she oversees all John Hardy collections, and leads the team of artisans. 

Summer 2016, John Hardy opened its first U.S. boutique in Houston and is scheduled to open the second in Manhattan. The building at 11 Prince Street, between Greene and Wooster streets in the SoHo neighborhood, will take up an entire building over three floors.

John Hardy has since opened boutiques in Century City, Aventura, South Coast Plaza, The Forum Shops at Caesars Palace alongside premium outlets at Woodbury Commons and Desert Hills. Their jewelry can also be found at locations in the Caribbean, Indonesia, Hong Kong, and Korea through major department stores.

As of April 24, 2019, John Hardy announced the advancement of three key executives as part of the company’s continuing, successful transformation. In line with the Board and Management’s structured succession plan, current CEO Robert Hanson will assume the role of Non-Executive Chairman of the Board of Directors; Kareem Gahed, who currently serves as Chief Revenue Officer, will assume the role of CEO, and Audrey Finci, who is currently COO/CFO, will take on the role of President - COO/CFO.

Designs
John Hardy jewelry is known for its artisan handcrafted designs using reclaimed sterling silver and gold using traditional Balinese jewelry-making techniques that have been passed down through generation. All of their Diamonds are sourced strictly following the United Nations resolution and the Kimberley Process and Gemstones along with other natural materials are sourced following their Ethical Sourcing Code of Conduct.

Environmental and Social Consciousness 
"Greener Every Day" is a company slogan used to summarize and describe its efforts to be a "green" company (the ultimate goal being to become carbon neutral). In 2006, John Hardy launched its "Sustainable Advertising" program to offset the carbon emissions from its print advertising, business travel and electricity consumption.  It does so by planting bamboo on Bali and Nusa Penida, a small island off the coast of Bali. Through its "Wear Bamboo, Plant Bamboo" program, a portion of the proceeds from the sale of its Bamboo collection items are used to fund the company’s continuous bamboo plantings.

Acquisition by L Catterton Partners Equity Firm 
On July 31, 2014 L Catterton Partners, a leading private equity firm, acquired John Hardy and announced that Robert Hanson would take over as Chief Executive Officer.

As of April 24, 2019 Robert Hanson has assumed the role of Chairman and Kareem Gahed has been announced CEO.

References

External links
John Hardy official site

Canadian jewellery designers
Indonesian companies established in 1975
Bali
Jewellery companies of Hong Kong
Jewellery companies of Indonesia
Bamboo
Design companies established in 1975